Elections to Larne Borough Council were held on 17 May 1989 on the same day as the other Northern Irish local government elections. The election used three district electoral areas to elect a total of 15 councillors.

Election results

Note: "Votes" are the first preference votes.

Districts summary

|- class="unsortable" align="centre"
!rowspan=2 align="left"|Ward
! % 
!Cllrs
! % 
!Cllrs
! %
!Cllrs
! %
!Cllrs
!rowspan=2|TotalCllrs
|- class="unsortable" align="center"
!colspan=2 bgcolor="" | UUP
!colspan=2 bgcolor="" | DUP
!colspan=2 bgcolor="" | Alliance
!colspan=2 bgcolor="white"| Others
|-
|align="left"|Coast Road
|bgcolor="40BFF5"|36.0
|bgcolor="40BFF5"|2
|30.0
|1
|13.1
|1
|20.9
|1
|5
|-
|align="left"|Larne Lough
|bgcolor="40BFF5"|61.0
|bgcolor="40BFF5"|3
|27.4
|2
|11.6
|0
|0.0
|0
|5
|-
|align="left"|Larne Town
|bgcolor="40BFF5"|31.0
|bgcolor="40BFF5"|2
|29.4
|1
|10.0
|1
|29.6
|1
|5
|-
|- class="unsortable" class="sortbottom" style="background:#C9C9C9"
|align="left"| Total
|42.7
|7
|29.1
|4
|11.5
|2
|16.7
|2
|15
|-
|}

Districts results

Coast Road

1985: 2 x DUP, 1 x UUP, 1 x Alliance, 1 x Independent Nationalist
1989: 2 x UUP, 1 x DUP, 1 x Alliance, 1 x Independent Nationalist
1985-1989 Change: UUP gain from DUP

Larne Lough

1985: 3 x UUP, 2 x DUP
1989: 3 x DUP, 2 x UUP
1985-1989 Change: No change

Larne Town

1985: 2 x UUP, 2 x DUP, 1 x Alliance
1989: 2 x UUP, 1 x DUP, 1 x Alliance, 1 x Independent
1985-1989 Change: Independent gain from DUP

References

Larne Borough Council elections
Larne